Eliogabalo (Heliogabalus) is an opera by the Italian composer Francesco Cavalli based on the life of the Roman emperor Heliogabalus. The author of the original libretto is unknown but it was probably reworked by Aurelio Aureli. The opera was composed in 1667 and was intended to be premiered during the Venetian Carnival season of 1668. In fact, it was never staged and was replaced by another opera of the same name by Giovanni Antonio Boretti, perhaps because Cavalli's style was considered too old-fashioned.

Eliogabalo was first performed in 1999, in Crema, Italy. 

Eliogabalo was revived at La Monnaie in 2004 by René Jacobs. Its North American premiere took place in 2007 at the Aspen Music Festival, conducted by Jane Glover. Gotham Chamber Opera in performed it in 2013 in a Manhattan nightclub in Chrystie Street, Richard Kimmel's The Box, directed by James Marvel. In a co-production with the Dutch National Opera, the Paris Opera opened its 2016/17 season in the Palais Garnier with Eliogabalo under the baton of Leonardo García Alarcón and with Franco Fagioli in the title role, Paul Groves as Alessandro, Nadine Sierra as Flavia, Valer Barna-Sabadus as Giuliano, Elin Rombo as Eritrea. In 2017 it was performed again under Leonardo García Alarcón in Amsterdam.

Roles

References

External links
Eliogabalo, Brenac, Jean-Claude, Le magazine de l'opéra baroque 

Cultural depictions of Elagabalus
Operas
Operas by Francesco Cavalli
1668 operas
Italian-language operas
Operas based on real people
Operas set in ancient Rome
Fiction set in the Roman Empire
Works set in the 3rd century